"Bronię się" is a song by Polish singer Sarsa, and the lead single off of her second studio album Pióropusze. The song was released in Poland as a digital download on 10 March 2017, through Universal Music Polska. It was written by Sarsa Markiewicz, and produced by Markiewicz along with Steve Manovski.

After its release, the song reached number-three on the Polish Airplay – New Chart, and number-26 on the Polish Airplay chart.

Music video 
A music video to accompany the release of "Bronię się" was released on 9 March 2017 through Sarsa's Vevo channel. It was directed by Marcin Starzecki.

Track listing

Charts and certifications

Weekly charts

Certifications

Release history

References

2017 songs
2017 singles
Sarsa (singer) songs
Universal Music Group singles
Polish-language songs